Mohamed Khasib Sulaiyam Al-Hosni (born 24 March 1994), commonly known as Mohamed Khasib, is an Omani footballer who plays for Al-Nahda in Oman Professional League and the Oman national football team as a midfielder or forward.

Career

International
Khasib made his debut for Oman national football team in a friendly match on 16 December 2018 against Tajikistan. He was included in Oman's squad for the 2019 AFC Asian Cup in the United Arab Emirates.

Career statistics

International
Statistics accurate as of match played 17 January 2019

References

External links

1994 births
Living people
Omani footballers
Oman international footballers
Association football midfielders
Association football forwards
Al-Nahda Club (Oman) players
Oman Professional League players
2019 AFC Asian Cup players